Jukal may refer to:
 Jukal, India
 Jukal, Iran